Evros Soufli Football Club is an amateur Greek football club, based in Soufli, Evros.

The club was founded in 1928. From 2013 until 2016 they played in Gamma Ethniki.

Football clubs in Eastern Macedonia and Thrace
Association football clubs established in 1928
1928 establishments in Greece
Evros (regional unit)